State Highway 72 (SH 72) is a State Highway in Kerala, India that starts in Malappuram and ends in Thirurangadi. The highway is 29 km long.

The Route Map 
Malappuram (Km 48/9 of NH 213 and overlaps NH 213 for 2.0 km from the starting point) – Panakkad – Vengara.

See also 
Roads in Kerala
List of State Highways in Kerala

References 

State Highways in Kerala
Roads in Malappuram district